The 1977 UEFA Cup Final was played on 4 May 1977 and 18 May 1977 between Italian side Juventus and Spanish side Athletic Club. Juventus won 2-2 on away goals. 

This is the only triumph for an Italian side in an official European tournament without foreign players in its first team squad. It also marked Juventus' first title in European football, as well as the first time the UEFA Cup was won by a Southern European club.

Route to the final

Match details

First leg

Second leg

See also
1976–77 UEFA Cup
Blocco-Juve
Juventus F.C. in European football 
Athletic Bilbao in European football

References
RSSSF

2
Uefa Cup Final 1977
Uefa Cup Final 1977
1977
Uefa Cup Final 1977
Uefa Cup Final 1977
Uefa Cup Final
Uefa Cup Final
May 1977 sports events in Europe
1970s in Turin
Sports competitions in Turin